FC Digora is a Russian football team from Digora. It played professionally for one season in 1996, taking 18th place in Zone 1 of the Russian Third League.

Team name history
 1993 FC Atlant Digora
 1994–2005 FC Gofrokarton Digora
 2005–present FC Digora

External links
  Team history at KLISF

Association football clubs established in 1993
Football clubs in Russia
Sport in North Ossetia–Alania
1993 establishments in Russia